David Baron (born February 15, 1973) is a French mixed martial artist and Shooto Middleweight European Champion. He has also competed for the UFC and Pride Fighting Championships. He holds wins over Dan Hardy and Hayato Sakurai.

Championships and accomplishments

Mixed martial arts
 2 Hot 2 Handle
 2H2H Road To Japan Welterweight Tournament Winner
 Shooto
 Shooto Middleweight European Champion (2 times, First, Only)

Mixed martial arts record

|-
| Loss
| align=center| 17–4–1
| Jason Ponet
| Decision (unanimous)
| 100% Fight 18: VIP
| 
| align=center| 3
| align=center| 5:00
| Aubervilliers, France
|
|-
| Draw
| align=center| 17–3–1
| Gor Harutunian
| Decision (draw)
| 100% Fight: VIP
| 
| align=center| 3
| align=center| 5:00
| Paris, France
|
|-
| Loss
| align=center| 17–3
| Jim Miller
| Submission (rear-naked choke)
| UFC 89
| 
| align=center| 3
| align=center| 3:19
| London, England
|
|-
| Win
| align=center| 17–2
| Hayato Sakurai
| Submission (guillotine choke)
| Shooto: Shooto Tradition 1
| 
| align=center| 1
| align=center| 4:50
| Tokyo, Japan
|
|-
| Win
| align=center| 16–2
| Niek Tromp
| Submission (guillotine choke)
| Shooto: Belgium
| 
| align=center| 1
| align=center| 1:23
| Charleroi, Belgium
| Won Shooto European Middleweight Championship
|-
| Win
| align=center| 15–2
| Abdul Mohamed
| TKO (doctor stoppage)
| UF 7: 2 Tuf 2 Tap
| 
| align=center| 1
| align=center| 3:22
| England
|
|-
| Win
| align=center| 14–2
| Johnny Frachey
| KO (punch)
| Xtreme Gladiators 3
| 
| align=center| 1
| align=center| 4:58
| France
|
|-
| Win
| align=center| 13–2
| Jason Ball
| Submission (armbar)
| Ultimate Tear Up
| 
| align=center| 1
| align=center| 2:09
| Middlesbrough, England
|
|-
| Loss
| align=center| 12–2
| Takanori Gomi
| Submission (rear-naked choke)
| Pride - Bushido 12
| 
| align=center| 1
| align=center| 7:10
| Nagoya, Japan
| Non Title Fight
|-
| Win
| align=center| 12–1
| Joey Van Wanrooij
| Submission (strikes)
| 2H2H: Road to Japan
| 
| align=center| 1
| align=center| 1:35
| Netherlands
| Won 2H2H Road To Japan Welterweight Tournament
|-
| Win
| align=center| 11–1
| Dan Hardy
| Decision (unanimous)
| 2H2H: Road to Japan
| 
| align=center| 2
| align=center| 3:00
| Netherlands
| 2H2H Road To Japan Welterweight Tournament Semifinals
|-
| Loss
| align=center| 10–1
| Per Eklund
| Decision (unanimous)
| EVT 6: Ragnarok
| 
| align=center| 3
| align=center| 5:00
| Stockholm, Sweden
|
|-
| Win
| align=center| 10–0
| Erik Oganov
| KO (elbows)
| M-1 MFC: Russia vs. Europe
| 
| align=center| 2
| align=center| 3:12
| Saint Petersburg, Russia
|
|-
| Win
| align=center| 9–0
| Olivier Elizabeth
| Submission (rear-naked choke)
| PFA: Pancrase Fighting Association
| 
| align=center| 1
| align=center| 2:50
| Bonneull, France
|
|-
| Win
| align=center| 8–0
| Dan Hardy
| Submission (triangle choke)
| CWFC: Strike Force
| 
| align=center| 2
| align=center| 3:10
| Coventry, England
|
|-
| Win
| align=center| 7–0
| Sauli Heilimo
| Submission (reverse triangle choke)
| Shooto Sweden: Second Impact
| 
| align=center| 2
| align=center| 2:33
| Stockholm, Sweden
| Won Shooto European Middleweight Championship
|-
| Win
| align=center| 6–0
| Stale Nyang
| Decision (unanimous)
| EVT 4: Gladiators
| 
| align=center| 3
| align=center| 5:00
| Stockholm, Sweden
|
|-
| Win
| align=center| 5–0
| Roemer Trumpert
| Submission (triangle choke)
| Shooto Holland: Fight Night
| 
| align=center| 1
| align=center| 3:01
| Vlissingen, Netherlands
|
|-
| Win
| align=center| 4–0
| Jean Frederic Dutriat
| Submission (ankle lock)
| World Absolute Fight 2
| 
| align=center| 2
| align=center| 1:42
| Marrakech, Morocco
|
|-
| Win
| align=center| 3–0
| Martinsh Egle
| TKO (left hook to the body)
| Shooto Holland: The Lords of the Ring
| 
| align=center| 1
| align=center| 0:35
| Deventer, Netherlands
|
|-
| Win
| align=center| 2–0
| Dirk van Opstal
| Submission (armbar)
| Shooto Holland: Night of the Warriors
| 
| align=center| 1
| align=center| 2:19
| Netherlands
|
|-
| Win
| align=center| 1–0
| Carl Cincinnatus
| Submission (guillotine choke)
| Ultra Fight Kempokan
| 
| align=center| 2
| align=center| 2:08
| Paris, France
|

See also
 List of male mixed martial artists

References

External links
 
 

1973 births
Living people
People from Bois-Colombes
French male mixed martial artists
Welterweight mixed martial artists
Mixed martial artists utilizing judo
Sportspeople from Hauts-de-Seine
Ultimate Fighting Championship male fighters